Gorny is a rural locality (a selo)  in Kirovsky District, Primorsky Krai, Russia. Population:

History
From 1955 to 2013, it had the status of urban-type settlement. 
On December 19, 2013, it was downgraded to the status of rural locality.

References

Rural localities in Primorsky Krai